Hyperolius sankuruensis, also known as the Omaniundu reed frog, is a species of frog in the family Hyperoliidae. It is endemic to the Democratic Republic of the Congo and is known from its type locality, Omaniundu in the Sankuru Province, and from a number of unspecified other localities. It is one of the "lost" frogs that was rediscovered decades after the last previous sighting.

Description
Males have a well-developed gular flap. The dorsum is dark brown. There is a darker interorbital triangle, a medio-dorsal square spot, and a transverse lumbar band. The sides are darker. The pupil is horizontal.

Habitat and conservation
Information on the habitat, ecological requirements, and population status of Hyperolius sankuruensis are lacking. Presumably, it breeds in water. It is considered "data deficient" by the International Union for Conservation of Nature (IUCN).

References

sankuruensis
Frogs of Africa
Amphibians of the Democratic Republic of the Congo
Endemic fauna of the Democratic Republic of the Congo
Amphibians described in 1979
Taxa named by Raymond Laurent
Taxonomy articles created by Polbot